Boşçalı (also, Boshchaly) is a village in the Yevlakh District of Azerbaijan. The village forms part of the municipality of Huruushaghy.

References 

Populated places in Yevlakh District